Brigadier-General Sir Joseph Aloysius Byrne  (2 October 1874 – 13 November 1942) was the Royal Irish Constabulary's Inspector-General from 1916 until 1920. He later served in Sierra Leone, Seychelles and Kenya.

Biography
Byrne was born on 2 October 1874, the son of Dr J. Byrne, Deputy Lieutenant for County Londonderry. He was educated at St George's College, Weybridge.

He joined the Royal Inniskilling Fusiliers and was commissioned a second lieutenant on 23 December 1893, then promoted to lieutenant on 1 June 1897. After the outbreak of war in South Africa in October 1899, Byrne was with the 1st battalion of his regiment as it arrived in Durban for war service later the same year. The regiment soon saw heavy fighting, and Byrne was wounded at the Siege of Ladysmith, following which he returned home on the hospital ship Maine in March 1900. Promoted to captain on 11 April 1900, he was stationed at the regimental depot. He returned to South Africa, and continued to serve during the remainder of the war, but was invalided home in March 1902.

He later served as Assistant Adjutant-General at the War Office and was made Deputy Adjutant-General, Irish Command, on 27 April 1916, during the Easter Rising as Brigadier-General. He was appointed Inspector General of the Royal Irish Constabulary  on 1 August 1916. Byrne held the position of Inspector-General until 6 January 1920.  

Following his police service he was called to the Bar, Lincoln's Inn, London, in 1921. Later that year he entered the Colonial Service and in 1922 was appointed Governor of the Seychelles. Thereafter he was made Governor of Sierra Leone from 24 September 1927 to 1929, and again from 1930 to 23 May 1931. He was briefly indisposed from late 1929 until early 1930, during which time Mark Aitchison Young filled in for him as acting governor. As governor of Sierra Leone, Byrne made a habit of appointing European-educated Africans to as many posts as possible, particularly in the city of Freetown. The football club of East End Lions F.C. was established in Sierra Leone while he was governor.

In 1931 he was made Governor of Kenya. His time in Kenya coincided with the worldwide depression, and his government undertook various austerity measures. Despite this, he took steps to support European settler agriculture and increased funding for African peasant production. He also oversaw upgrades to hospital and prison facilities in Nairobi and Mombasa. His lack of sympathy towards the European settlers, and implementation of an income tax long opposed by many settlers, meant he was an unpopular figure in sections of the settler community.

Byrne retired in 1936, and died on 13 November 1942 in Surrey, England.

Personal life
Byrne married in 1908, Marjorie, daughter of Allan F. Joseph, of Cairo. She died 19 November 1960.

References

1874 births
1942 deaths
British Army brigadiers
People from County Londonderry
British civil servants
Catholic Unionists
Companions of the Order of the Bath
Knights Commander of the Order of the British Empire
Knights Grand Cross of the Order of St Michael and St George
British Army personnel of the Second Boer War
Royal Inniskilling Fusiliers officers
Colonial governors and administrators of Kenya
Inspectors-General of the Royal Irish Constabulary
Members of Lincoln's Inn
Governors of British Seychelles
People educated at St George's College, Weybridge
British Kenya people
British Army generals of World War I
Military personnel from County Londonderry